Panama is a country usually considered to be entirely in North America or Central America. Panama's economy, because of its key geographic location, is mainly based on a well developed service sector especially commerce, tourism, and trading. The handover of the Canal and military installations by the United States has given rise to large construction projects.

Notable firms 
This list includes notable companies with primary headquarters located in the country. The industry and sector follow the Industry Classification Benchmark taxonomy. Organizations which have ceased operations are included and noted as defunct.

See also 
 List of airlines of Panama

References 

Panama